The Call of Life is a 1937 French drama film directed by Georges Neveux and starring Victor Francen, Renée Devillers, and Daniel Lecourtois. It is a French-language film made in Berlin by the German studio UFA and released in France by the company's subsidiary L'Alliance Cinématographique Européenne

Cast

References

Bibliography

External links 
 

1937 films
German drama films
1937 drama films
1930s French-language films
UFA GmbH films
German black-and-white films
1930s German films